Castiglione d'Adda is a town and comune in the province of Lodi, in Lombardy, northern Italy.

Sights include the medieval castle (later Palazzo Pallavicino Serbelloni), with a 16th-century façade, and the 16th century parish church.

References

Cities and towns in Lombardy